The 2012 United States House of Representatives elections in Louisiana were held on Tuesday, November 6, 2012 and elected the six U.S. Representatives from the state of Louisiana, one from each of the state's six congressional districts, a loss of one seat following reapportionment according to the results of the 2010 Census. The elections coincided with elections for other federal and state offices, including a quadrennial presidential election. A jungle primary took place on November 6, with a runoff, if necessary, scheduled for December 8.

Overview

Redistricting
During the redistricting process, U.S. Representative Charles Boustany advocated a plan which, rather than drawing his home and that of Landry into the same district (as the bill which became law did), would instead make fellow Republican Representative John Fleming's district potentially more competitive. Fleming later said of Boustany, "I don't feel like I can trust anything he says. Everything he told me, he reneged on."

Due to difficulties reaching a consensus among the congressional delegation, U.S. Representatives Rodney Alexander, Bill Cassidy, Fleming, Jeff Landry and Steve Scalise wrote to Governor Bobby Jindal requesting that the state legislature postpone the redistricting process for a year.

Nonetheless, a redistricting bill was passed by the Louisiana House of Representatives and Louisiana Senate, and was signed into law by Jindal on April 14, 2011.

Louisiana is among the states which, according to a provision of the 1965 Voting Rights Act enacted upon states with a history of denial of voting rights, must submit legislative maps to the U.S. Department of Justice for approval in order to ascertain that the purpose and effects of the map are not discriminatory.

District 1

Republican Steve Scalise, who has represented the 1st district since 2008, is running for re-election.  In redistricting the 1st district has been extended from Metairie towards the Gulf Coast, including areas from the old 3rd district. and includes the cities of Slidell and Houma, and the two parishes hardest hit by Hurricane Katrina, St. Bernard and Plaquemines. It comprises 373,405 White Americans registered voters, 46,542 African Americans and 30,126 people of other ethnicities. Of its voters, 167,824 are affiliated to the Democratic Party, 167,336 to the Republican Party, and 114,913 to neither party.

Candidates

Republican Party
 Gary King
 Steve Scalise, incumbent U.S. Representative

Democratic Party
 M.V. "Vinny" Mendoza, organic farmer, Air Force veteran, and perennial candidate

Independents
 David "Turk" Turknett
 Arden Wells, candidate for this seat in 2010

General election

Results

District 2

Democrat Cedric Richmond, who has represented the 2nd district since January 2011, is running for re-election.  In redistricting, the district was extended in redistricting to include areas of the old 3rd and 6th district, along the Mississippi River to include Baton Rouge. It comprises 144,721 White Americans registered voters, 276,668 African Americans and 27,558 people of other ethnicities. Of its voters, 302,120 are Democrats, 51,268 are Republicans, and 95,559 are affiliated to neither party.

Candidates

Democratic Party
 Gary Landrieu, real estate developer and cousin of New Orleans Mayor Mitch Landrieu and U.S. Senator Mary Landrieu
 Cedric Richmond, incumbent U.S. Representative

Republican Party
 Dwayne Bailey, refinery worker
 Josue Larose, Super PAC organizer

Libertarian Party
 Caleb Trotter, banker and law school student

General election

Results

District 3

The 3rd district includes the homes of Republican incumbents Jeff Landry and Charles Boustany, who have represented the 3rd district since January 2011 and the now-defunct 7th district since 2005 respectively. It comprises 336,889 White Americans registered voters, 107,033 African Americans and 14,497 people of other ethnicities. Of its voters, 229,704 are Democrats, 120,787 are Republicans, and 107,928 are affiliated to neither party.

The district is located in southern Louisiana and stretches from the Texas border to Iberia and St. Martin parishes. It incorporates Lake Charles and Lafayette, which were centers of population in Boustany's former district. Terrebonne and Lafourche Parishes, which form a part of the district Landry currently represents, will no longer be in the 3rd district.

Candidates

Republican Party
 Bryan Barrilleaux, physician
 Charles Boustany, incumbent U.S. Representative for the 7th district
 Jeff Landry, incumbent U.S. Representative

Democratic Party
 Ron Richard, attorney

Libertarian Party
 Jim Stark, truck driver

General election

Results

Runoff

District 4

Republican John Fleming, who has represented the 4th district since 2009, is running for re-election.  The district comprises 276,373 White Americans registered voters, 140,630 African Americans and 15,020 people of other ethnicities. Of its voters, 221,187 are Democrats, 118,015 are Republicans, and 92,721 are affiliated to neither party. Its boundaries remain similar to those of its previous incarnation: it is anchored by Shreveport and borders Texas and Arkansas.

Candidates

Republican Party
 John Fleming, incumbent U.S. Representative

Libertarian Party
 Randall Lord, former chiropractor

Democratic Party

Declined
Brian Crawford, Shreveport's assistant chief administrative officer and former fire chief
Keith Hightower, former Mayor of Shreveport
Kyle Robinson, attorney
Patrick Williams, state representative

General election

Results

District 5

Republican Rodney Alexander, who has represented the 5th district since 2003, is running for re-election.  The district comprises 294,830 White Americans registered voters, 144,744 African Americans and 11,107 people of other ethnicities. Of its voters, 239,963 are Democrats, 117,624 are Republicans, and 93,094 are affiliated to neither party. The make-up of the 5th district, which mostly covers the northeast of the state, now takes in the northern reaches of the Florida Parishes north of Baton Rouge, which were a part of the old 1st and 6th districts.

Candidates

Republican Party
 Rodney Alexander, incumbent U.S. Representative

Libertarian Party
 Clay Grant, businessman

Independents
 Ron Ceasar, 2011 Louisiana gubernatorial candidate

General election

District 6

Republican Bill Cassidy, who has represented the 6th district since 2009, is running for re-election.  The district comprises 334,899 White Americans registered voters, 88,460 African Americans and 16,873 people of other ethnicities.  Of its voters, 194,088 are Democrats, 143,160 are Republicans, and 102,984 are affiliated to neither party. It includes the suburbs of Baton Rouge and extends south as far as the outskirts of Houma.

Candidates

Republican Party
 Bill Cassidy, incumbent U.S. Representative

Libertarian Party
 Rufus Holt Craig, Jr., lawyer and 2004 Democratic candidate for Louisiana's 6th congressional district

Independents
 Richard "RPT" Torregano, technician

General election

Results

References

External links
Elections at the Louisiana Secretary of State
United States House of Representatives elections in Louisiana, 2012 at Ballotpedia
Louisiana U.S. House at OurCampaigns.com
Campaign contributions for U.S. Congressional races in Louisiana at OpenSecrets
Outside spending at the Sunlight Foundation
Statistics, demographics and maps of the new congressional districts, published by the Louisiana State Legislature

United States House of Representatives
Louisiana
2012